Marcel Dominik Zajac (born April 29, 1998) is a Canadian professional soccer player who plays as a forward for League1 Ontario club Guelph United.

Early life
Zajac was born in Toronto to Polish parents, and later moved to Mississauga at age three. He began playing soccer at age six with local club Erin Mills SC. Afterwards, he joined the Sigma FC academy.

College career
In 2016, Zajac began attending the University of Akron, where he played for the men's soccer team on a scholarship. He scored his first collegiate goal on October 7, 2017 against the Buffalo Bulls. In 2018, he helped Akron win the Mid-American Conference title and was named MAC tournament MVP, as well as finishing as runner-ups for the NCAA National Tournament. He was named a Second Team All-MAC All-Star in 2018. He then spent some time training with Major League Soccer club Columbus Crew. After the season, he departed Akron to turn professional, rather than to return for his senior season.

Club career
While attending the University of Akron, Zajac continued to play with his youth club Sigma FC in the summer in League1 Ontario, beginning in 2015. In 2016, he made 13 league appearances for Sigma, scoring five goals. The following year, Zajac made six appearances and added three goals. In 2018, he scored a career-high seven goals in eight appearances. He scored back-to-back hat-tricks on May 12, 2018 against Windsor TFC and May 19, 2018 against Ottawa South United.

On January 8, 2019, Zajac signed his first professional contract with Canadian Premier League side Forge FC, joining former Sigma FC coach Bobby Smyrniotis. He made his professional debut as a substitute in the inaugural CPL match against York9.

In March 2021, it was reported that Zajac signed with Watra Białka Tatrzańska of the Polish fifth division. In June 2021, he trialled with Polish club OKS Stomil Olsztyn.

In July 2021, Zajac signed with II liga side Olimpia Elbląg. He left the club by mutual consent on November 30, 2021.

In 2022, he played with Guelph United F.C. in League1 Ontario.

International career
In 2014, he was called up to a camp with the Canada U17 team, and later attended a camp with the Canada U20 team.

Personal life
Zajac's father, Czesław, was also a professional soccer player, who played professionally in Poland and Canada.

Honours

Club
Forge FC
Canadian Premier League: 2019, 2020

References

External links

1998 births
Living people
Association football forwards
Canadian soccer players
Soccer players from Toronto
Soccer players from Mississauga
Canadian people of Polish descent
Canadian expatriate soccer players
Expatriate soccer players in the United States
Expatriate footballers in Poland
Canadian expatriate sportspeople in the United States
Canadian expatriate sportspeople in Poland
Akron Zips men's soccer players
Sigma FC players
Forge FC players
Olimpia Elbląg players
League1 Ontario players
Canadian Premier League players
II liga players
Guelph United F.C. players